Katechis or Katehis is a Greek surname. The feminine form is Katechi or Katehi. It comes from the noun katecho (κατέχω, "to own"). Surname's origin is Othonoi, an island of Ionian Sea, Greece. It is also a common surname on Ereikoussa and Mathraki, two of the Diapontian Islands. Notable people with the surname include:

 Linda Katehi (born 1954), Greek-American engineer, Professor of Electrical and Computer Engineering at Texas A&M University.
 Dale Katechis, owner of the Oskar Blues Brewery in Colorado.
 Anastasios Katechis, assistant professor in University of Athens.
 John Katechis (born 1992), murderer in 2009 of George Weber
 Spyros Katechis, Greek-Egyptian military leader and spy during WWII

References

Sources
 http://www.omogenia.com/othoni/ellinika.htm

Greek-language surnames